Tayo Ayeni (born 28 December 1962) is a Nigerian businessman with interests in automobile sales and real estates.

Background
Tayo Ayeni was born in Ibadan to the family of Chief Isaiah Sunday Ayeni and Mrs. Mojisola Alice. He hails from Ilesa, Osun State, Nigeria. Tayo once described his father as a disciplinarian and his role model. “I was brought up in a polygamous home. It was quite interesting and educative. My father, Chief I.S. Ayeni, popularly known as ‘Baba 10 10’ of blessed memory was fully in charge of his household. He ensured we did family activities together.” 
Tayo Ayeni attended African Church Grammar School, Ilesa, and later moved to Ilesha Grammar School, Ilesa, Osun State for his A-level. He proceeded to Italy where he studied Electrical Engineering.

Career
Tayo Ayeni is the Chairman/CEO of Skymit Motors Limited. In an interview he granted Lanre Alfred, Society Editor of ThisDay Newspapers, he said he was privy to know about automobile business and European car dealership during his study days in Italy. Returning to Nigeria after his education, his intended to “revolutionalize the way (automobile) business was being done back home in Nigeria.” He then founded a company he called Skymit Motors Limited, which, according to him, is a contraction of ‘Sky is the limit.’ Information on its website shows that the automobile company was incorporated in 1986 as a Private Limited Company with an initial start-up capital of Five Hundred Thousand Naira (N500,000.00), which has a yearly turnover level of five billion Naira today. Its sales are targeted towards “a selected group of Nigeria's corporate organizations and high-net-worth individuals who are in dire need of corporate, sleek but durable cars at affordable prices, packaged and tailored towards their financial status and personality.”  Skymit became operation in January 1987 with only two cars; it now has offices/showrooms in Ikeja and Victoria Island (Lagos). He is also the Chairman of Affordable Cars Limited, a low and medium car sales and service outfit, which is run by his younger brother. He also heads Space Ventures Ltd, which deals in photographic materials; he is chairman of Space Properties, a real estate firm; Moontrends Holdings, a project financing and management firm, and Limoserve among others.

Other interests 
Tayo Ayeni is a known socialite. His 50th birthday generated publicity in the Nigerian media.

He is a member of the Nigerian-Italian Alumni, Nigeria-South Africa Chambers of Commerce, Ikoyi Club, Lagos Country Club, Lagos Anglican Church Communion (Christian Friends Society), The Lagos Motor Boat Club, Aquamarine Boat Club and he is also a member of Lagos Jetski Club, Ikoyi.

Awards and honors

He has received several local and international awards in recognition of his entrepreneurship undertakings. 

These awards include: 

‘Best Entrepreneurial CEO' - Ikeja City Award (four consecutive years)

‘Best Multi-Stock Showroom’ – On-Wheels Magazine (2006/2009)

'Auto Company of the Year' - Excellence Recognition Awards - (2008)

‘King of Luxury’ - Niteshift Coliseum

'Best Car Dealer of the Year' - LEAD AFRICA (2013)

'Outstanding CEO of the Year' - Ikeja City Award

'Lifetime Achievement Award' - LEAD AFRICA (2014)

'Most Outstanding CEO of the Year' - Pan African International Magazine (2018)
amongst others.

Personal life
Tayo is married to Adetutu Ayeni, a trained lawyer and a director of Skymit Motors Limited. She is the Managing Director of Space Properties and a member of the advisory council of Grange School. “I met her while she was studying law at Lagos State University," Ayeni said. They are blessed with five children.

References

External links
 Skymit Motors Limited website

Living people
1962 births
20th-century Nigerian businesspeople
21st-century Nigerian businesspeople
Yoruba businesspeople
Businesspeople from Ibadan
Nigerian socialites
Nigerian company founders
Nigerian real estate businesspeople
Nigerian automobile salespeople